Mahdah (or Wilāyat Maḥḍah, is an Omani territory north of the town of al Buraimi which borders the emirates of Sharjah, Ajman and Dubai. It was previously necessary to pass through Mahdah when travelling through Madam to reach the Ajman exclave of Masfut, as well as the Dubai exclave of Hatta, a tourist spot popular for its hotel, heritage village and the famous (although now a metalled road) Hatta track. The Mleiha road bypasses Mahdah for travel from the Emirates' coastal towns to Hatta and Masfut. 

Mahdah contains the township of Rawdah and is governed from Buraimi. It was traditionally home to the Bani Kaab tribe.

Border 
Previously a 'soft' border, the road through Mahdah from the Emirates now has formal border entry and exit points, open only to GCC nationals. Crossing the Omani border at Mahdah represents an exit from/entry to the UAE.

The trip to the Omani border at Hatta is a popular one for expatriates from qualifying countries performing a 'visa run' in order to renew their visit visas to the UAE. A visit visa is valid for one month, renewable at a police station up to three months but then requires an exit from the country. As a number of, mainly Western, nationalities acquire a 'visa on entry', a trip to the Hatta border post and then back results in the renewal of an expired three-month visit visa. This trip has been rendered a great deal less popular since Dubai, and the UAE in general, has reformed immigration practices and streamlined residence visa issuance and renewal.

It is claimed the first Arab Ambassador to America, Ahmed Bin Na’man Al Kaabi, came from Mahdah in 1840.

A district with the same Arabic name but with a different spelling of its name in English, Madha is an Omani enclave on the East Coast of the UAE which surrounds Nahwa, itself an enclave of Sharjah. This unusual arrangement is known as a counter-enclave.

References 

Oman–United Arab Emirates border crossings
Populated places in Al Buraimi Governorate